Jurmo is an island and a village in the municipality of Pargas in the outer islands  of the archipelago off of Turku, Finland. The island has had its own church since 1846 and a bird observatory. Although there are dozen or so permanent residents on the island, they are joined by quite a few part-time residents come summertime.

The island of Jurmo was formed during the ice age and, as an island surrounded by large amounts of gravel, and not consisting of only rock like most other islands in the region, is actually a distant continuation of the Third Salpausselkä.

References
Map of the Archipelago

External links 

 http://www.korpo.net/jurmo.html
 http://www.vafo.fi/kyrkor-och-kapell/202-jurmo-kapell
 http://www.nationalparks.fi/archipelagonp/history

Finnish islands in the Baltic
Pargas
Landforms of Southwest Finland
Geography of Southwest Finland